Cuthbert Reeves Kempe (10 February 1856 – 18 April 1953) was an English cricketer.  Kempe's batting and bowling styles are unknown.  He was born at Long Ashton, Somerset.

Kempe made 2 first-class appearances for Gloucestershire in 1877 against Surrey at The Oval and Sussex at the County Ground, Hove.  In his 2 first-class matches, Kempe scored 28 runs at a batting average of 9.33, with a high score of 15.  In the field he took a single catch.

He died in Weston-super-Mare, Somerset on 18 April 1953, aged 97.

References

External links
Cuthbert Kempe at Cricinfo
Cuthbert Kempe at CricketArchive

1856 births
1953 deaths
People from North Somerset (district)
English cricketers
Gloucestershire cricketers